The Tinder Fire was a wildfire that burned  of the Coconino National Forest in the U.S. State of Arizona in mid-2018. The fire was detected by a United States Forest Service (USFS) lookout tower on April 27, 2018. The USFS immediately began efforts to contain the spread of the Tinder Fire, which benefited from high winds, low humidity, and high temperatures. Rapid growth of the fire over late April prompted the closure of Arizona State Route 87 and evacuation orders for 1,000 houses in Coconino County. These orders remained until May 4, when the fire had been mostly contained despite continued high winds. The fire was declared to be fully contained on May 24. Investigation determined that the Tinder Fire was caused by an illegal campfire.

Background
Wildfires are a natural part of the ecological cycle of the Southwestern United States. The Tinder Fire was one of 2,000 wildfires that burned  in Arizona in 2018. In January 2018, Doug Ducey, the Governor of Arizona, warned that Arizona—then in a historically dry winter season, plagued by drought, and recovering from the 2017 wildfire season—could face a "disastrous" wildfire season in 2018. At the time the Tinder Fire began, weather conditions in the Mogollon Rim region of Arizona were abnormally dry, hot, and windy; four red flag warnings had been issued for the area since April 1.

In June 2019, the Ecological Restoration Institute (ERI) at Northern Arizona University published a study of the 2018 wildfire season in Arizona and New Mexico. The ERI observed that the amount of land burned in the 2018 season was below the average of the previous ten seasons. 13 fires were studied, of which four were in Arizona and included the Tinder Fire.

Fire
Winds as fast as  fanned the fire and hindered firefighting aviation—which was grounded on April 29 by a civilian drone flying over the fire—over April 28 and April 29. This rapid growth prompted the closure of Arizona State Route 87 (SR 87), evacuation orders for 1000 homes in Coconino County, and the declaration of a state of emergency in Coconino County by Ducey on April 30.

The next day, however, rain and snow slowed the growth of the fire and allowed firefighters to make progress in containing its spread. By May 3, 625 firefighters worked on containing the Tinder Fire, a process then estimated to be 48% completed. Evacuation orders began to lifted on May 4, by which time the fire had grown to an area of  but was believed to be 79% contained. SR 87 was also reopened to public traffic on May 4. By May 12, the fire had grown to  but no further despite windy conditions; by May 24, it was declared to be 95% contained.

Aftermath
The Tinder Fire burned  over 27 days and cost $7,500,000 to contain and suppress. About 10% of that area suffered total foliage mortality. The Tinder Fire destroyed 96 buildings, of which 33 were homes and 63 were minor structures. At the fire's peak, 695 firefighters worked to contain its spread.

Investigation into the cause of the fire began on April 27 and was determined by May 1 to be an abandoned, illegal campfire. Investigators were unable to determine the responsible party.

References

External links
 

2018 Arizona wildfires
April 2018 events in the United States
Coconino National Forest
Events in Coconino County, Arizona
May 2018 events in the United States